The communauté de communes du Haut Pays Marchois  was located in the Creuse département of the Limousin  region of central France. It was created in January 2002. It was merged into the new Communauté de communes Marche et Combraille en Aquitaine in January 2017.

It comprised the following 13 communes:

Basville
Crocq
Flayat
La Mazière-aux-Bons-Hommes
Mérinchal
Pontcharraud
Saint-Agnant-près-Crocq
Saint-Bard
Saint-Georges-Nigremont
Saint-Maurice-près-Crocq
Saint-Oradoux-près-Crocq
Saint-Pardoux-d'Arnet
La Villeneuve

See also
Communes of the Creuse department

References  

Haut Pays Marchois